The following is a list of national flagbearers for the 70 countries which took part in the 2012 Winter Youth Olympics.

Athletes entered the stadium in an order dictated by tradition. As the originator of the Olympics, Greece entered first. Austrian delegates entered last, representing the host nation. The delegations entered by German the official language of the host nation.

List

References

2012 Winter Youth Olympics
Lists of Olympic flag bearers
2012 in youth sport